Yangang is a small town in South Sikkim district of the Indian state of Sikkim. Yangang is the projected site for the construction of a Sikkim University campus. Yangang is also the birthplace of the former Chief Minister of Sikkim (1994 - 2019), Shri Pawan Kumar Chamling. The state's largest police training center is in Yangang.  Yangang has a number of natural tourism resources including Mainam Hill (popularly known as Bhalay-Dhunga), Tig-Day Cho lake, Neya Khola Falls, Mahadev Than, Yangang Monastery, Gurung Monastery, Lepcha Monastery, Ramitay Bhir. Yangang will be soon have projects carried out in it such as the Ropeway to Bhalay Dhunga, Sky Walk at Bhalay Dhunga, Lepcha Heritage Center, and the Cultural Park.

Notable People 

Dorjee Kazi - Former Minister 
Pawan Chamling - 5th Chief Minister of Sikkim 
BM Ramudamu - Former Minister 
CB Karki - Former Minister 
Ugen T Gyatsho - Former Minister 
LB Das - Speaker, Sikkim Legislative Assembly
RN Chamling - Former MLA 
Nimthit Lepcha - Former MLA 
Bikash Basnet - Press Secretary to Chief Minister

References

Yangang is a small town in South Sikkim, which is slowly converging into a much happening place, an educational hub and a tourist destination with many projects up in the line.

Cities and towns in Namchi district